Mekanïk Destruktïẁ Kommandöh, also abbreviated as  MDK, is the third studio album by French rock band Magma, released on 6 May 1973. The album marks a shift away from the jazz style of the band's first two albums, encompassing progressive rock, contemporary classical, avant-garde music, funk and gospel in its musical style. Magma's original recording of the composition that makes up the album was refused by the record company at the time, but was eventually released as Mekanïk Kommandöh in 1989.

MDK is the group's most famous and acclaimed record. The French edition of Rolling Stone magazine named the album the 33rd greatest French rock album. In 2015, Rolling Stone ranked the album 24th on its list of the '50 Greatest Prog Rock Albums of All Time'.

Track listing

Track 8 is a (mostly) instrumental demo of the piece that also appears on the double-CD rarities compilation Archiẁ I & II, available only on the 12 disc box set Studio Zünd: 40 Ans d'Evolution.

Personnel

 Klaus Blasquiz – vocals, percussion
 Stella Vander – vocals
 Muriel Streisfield – vocals
 Evelyne Razymovski – vocals
 Michele Saulnier – vocals
 Doris Reinhardt – vocals
 René Garber – bass clarinet, vocals
 Teddy Lasry – brass, flute
 Jean-Luc Manderlier – piano, organ
 Claude Olmos – guitar
 Jannick Top – bass
 Christian Vander – drums, vocals, organ, percussion

with
 Giorgio Gomelsky – producer
 Eddie Sprigg – engineer
 Gilbert – engineer
 Gilles Sallé – engineer
 Simon Heyworth – engineer
 Steve Michell – engineer
 Tom Rabstener – engineer
 Loulou Sarkissian – stage manager

References

External links
 
 

1973 albums
A&M Records albums
Albums produced by Giorgio Gomelsky
Classical albums by French artists
Concept albums
Funk albums by French artists
Jazz fusion albums by French artists
Gospel albums
Magma (band) albums
Mercury Records albums
Progressive rock albums by French artists
Vertigo Records albums